Helloworld Travel was a group of franchised travel agencies based in Australia. It is one of the oldest travel agencies in Australia. Since opening its first office in May 1951, it has expanded to over 500 agencies throughout Australia, New Zealand and South Africa.

In 2013, Harvey World Travel's parent company, Jetset Travelworld Group (JTG), rebranded the agencies as Helloworld Travel in Australia and New Zealand, as part of a major overhaul that also included JTG being rebranded as Helloworld Ltd.  The original brand remains in use in South Africa.

Product and services
Products and services include flights, accommodations, car hire, packaged holidays, rail and cruising.

References

Further reading
 
 
 
 
 
 
 
 
 
 
 

Travel and holiday companies of Australia
Transport companies established in 1951
Travel agencies
Companies based in Brisbane
Australian companies established in 1951